Perkins School of Theology is one of Southern Methodist University's three original schools and is located in Dallas, Texas. The theology school was renamed in 1945 to honor benefactors Joe J. and Lois Craddock Perkins of Wichita Falls, Texas. Degree programs include the Master of Divinity (M.Div.), Master of Sacred Music, Master of Theological Studies (MTS), Master of Arts in Ministry, Master of Theology (Th.M.), Doctor of Ministry (D.Min.), and Doctor of Pastoral Music as well as the Ph.D., in cooperation with The Graduate Program in Religious Studies at SMU’s Dedman College of Humanities and Sciences. It is one of only five university-related theological institutions of the United Methodist Church, and one of the denomination's 13 seminaries, offering opportunities for interdisciplinary learning, and accredited by the Association of Theological Schools (ATS). There is a hybrid-extension program in Houston-Galveston.

Bridwell Library
The Bridwell Library is one of the leading theological research collections in the United States. It is named for its benefactor Joseph Sterling Bridwell, an oilman and rancher who was a neighbor of the Perkinses in Wichita Falls.

The Bridwell Library houses a religious studies research collection of more than 385,000 volumes and collections of rare books, Bibles, and manuscripts.

Specialized study
Students in the M.Div., M.A.M., and M.T.S. degree programs may choose from the following areas of concentration:  African American Church Studies, Anglican Studies,
Church/Nonprofit Management (with SMU's Cox School of Business), Hispanic Studies, Pastoral Care, Social Innovation and Nonprofit Engagement (with SMU's Meadows School of the Arts), Urban Ministry, Women's and Gender Studies.  Other programs of interest include spiritual formation and Global Theological Education.

Notable alumni/ae

Kathleen Baskin-Ball
Kirbyjon Caldwell
Minerva G. Carcaño
Adam Hamilton (pastor)
 John Wesley Hardt
Zan Wesley Holmes Jr 
Janice Riggle Huie
Hiram "Doc" Jones
Charles R. Moore (minister)
Bryan Stone
Cecil Williams

Notable faculty
 Charles Curran (theologian), Elizabeth Scurlock University Professor of Human Values
 Ruben Habito, Professor of World Religions and Spirituality

Emeritus and deceased faculty members
  William J. Abraham, Albert Cook Outler Professor of Wesley Studies
  Joseph L. Allen, Yale University, Professor Emeritus of Ethics
  William S. Babcock,  Yale University, Professor Emeritus of Church History
  Jouette M. Bassler, Yale University, Professor Emerita of New Testament
  Victor Paul Furnish,  Yale University, University Distinguished Professor Emeritus of New Testament
 John Wesley Hardt, Southern Methodist University, Bishop in Residence Emeritus
  Kenneth W. Hart, University of Cincinnati, Professor Emeritus of Sacred Music
  John C. Holbert,  Southern Methodist University, Professor Emeritus of Homiletics
  Leroy T. Howe, Yale University, Professor Emeritus of Pastoral Theology
  James E. Kirby,  Drew University, Professor Emeritus of Church History
  H. Neill McFarland,  Columbia University, Professor Emeritus of History of Religion
  Richard D. Nelson, Union Theological Seminary, Professor Emeritus of Biblical Hebrew and Old Testament Interpretation
  Schubert M. Ogden,  University of Chicago, University Distinguished Professor Emeritus of Theology
  Klaus Penzel, Union Theological Seminary, Professor Emeritus of Church History
  Edward W. Poitras,  Drew University, Professor Emeritus of World Christianity
  W. J. A. Power, University of Toronto, W. J. A. Power Professor Emeritus of Biblical Hebrew and Old Testament Interpretation
  Marjorie Procter-Smith,  University of Notre Dame, Le Van Professor Emerita of Preaching and Worship
  Charles M. Wood, Yale University, Lehman Professor Emeritus of Christian Doctrine 
 Albert C. Outler, Yale University, Professor of Theology Emeritus

Present and former Bishops-in-Residence
 D. Max Whitfield, current bishop-in-residence and director, Center for Religious Leadership
 William Kenneth Pope
 John Wesley Hardt 
 David J. Lawson
 William B. Oden
 William McFerrin Stowe

References

External links
 "Perkins Theological Quadrangle Construction: A Case History", a film about the site's construction, as uploaded by the G. William Jones Film & Video Collection.

United Methodist seminaries
Theology, Perkins School of
Seminaries and theological colleges in Texas
Educational institutions established in 1911
1911 establishments in Texas